Pendelfin is a company specializing in handcrafted and handpainted stoneware based in Burnley, Lancashire, England.  It has a very large fan club which covers Europe, North America and Australia.  It was started by Jean Walmsley Heap and Jeannie Todd in the early 1950s and went on to be a thriving business.  It was originally started as a hobby for making presents for family but quickly gained worldwide fame.  It got the name from a famous hill near Burnley called Pendle Hill, which is famous for tales of witches and ghouls. As a result the first model produced by the company was named the Pendle Witch. Many figures are now fetching thousands of pounds.

Further reading

External links
  — pictures of Jean Walmsley Heap celebrating Pendelfin's Golden Anniversary at Port Perry, Ontario
 Pendelfin company web site
 Images of Pendelfin products

Companies based in Burnley